Sa Caleta is a cove on the south west seaboard of the Spanish island of Ibiza.

Description
Sa Caleta is a horseshoe shaped bay lined with many rustic fisherman’s sheds. Because of its sheltered situation it is an ideal spot for sunbathing and it is often frequented by the local people of the island who like spending their sunny days off, bathing among friends and family in the coves crystal waters.

The Phoenicians
Back in ancient times the cove of Sa Caleta was the busy natural harbour of the Phoenician settlers who had built a settlement on the headland at the southern tip of the cove. The cove is still used today by a few local fishing boats and the occasional pleasure craft often moor here.

See also
 Sa Caleta Phoenician Settlement

References

Beaches of Ibiza
Beaches of the Balearic Islands